The 2013 Sagan Tosu season was Sagan Tosu's second season in J.League Division 1 after being promoted for J.League Division 2 in 2011. They finished the season in twelfth position, whilst participating in the J.League Cup group stages and reaching the Semifinal of the Emperor's Cup.

Players

Transfers

Winter

In:

Out:

Summer

In:

Out:

Competitions

J.League

Results summary

Matches

League table

J.League Cup

Group stage

Emperor's Cup

Squad statistics

Goal Scorers

Disciplinary record

References

Sagan Tosu
Sagan Tosu seasons